GEA (Gustaf Ericssons Automobilfabrik) was a Swedish automobile manufacturer founded by Gustaf Ericsson (son of Lars Magnus Ericsson) in 1904 in Stockholm. Originally the company was located in Arbetargatan, but later it moved to Liljeholmen. Together with his study friends from Chalmers University of Technology K G Karlsson and Erik L Magnus they had the expertise needed for the project. The company started making engines, but at first not for cars, but kerosene engines for pumps and agricultural machines. Later they also made boat engines under the name "Gurik". After a few years Gustaf Ericsson thought it was time to build a car. It was to be powered by a six-cylinder engine, a first for Europe. One of the biggest problems was with the magneto. They asked Bosch for help, but they said they couldn't solve the problem. In the end K G Karlsson solved it by using two magnetos. The engine was basically two Fafnir engines in a row, driving the rear wheels via a chain. The chassis was also made in Germany. In 1905 the car was finished. Because of its size it was nicknamed "Ormen Långe". According to news reports it had a top speed of 60 km/h. However the market was not ready for such a car and it didn't enter production. However GEA imported, assembled and adopted cars for the Swedish market. The company folded in 1909.

Gustaf Ericsson later designed the 1933 Volvo Venus Bilo, a very early example of streamlined cars.

References 

Manufacturing companies based in Stockholm
Defunct motor vehicle manufacturers of Sweden